Ayel Haqawi (born 26 September 1994) is a Saudi Arabian professional footballer who plays as a left back for Al-Nahda.

Club career
Haqawi started his career in the youth team of Al-Nassr before moving to Al-Faisaly's U23 side. On 6 December 2016, Haqawi joined Najran. He made his debut ten days later by coming off the bench in the 75th minute in the win 1–0 against Al-Nahda. On 6 June 2018, Haqawi joined Al-Nahda. He made his debut for Al-Nahda on 28 August 2018 in the league match against Al-Shoulla. On 15 July 2019, Haqawi left Al-Nahda and joined Al-Shoulla on a one-year deal. He made his debut on 21 August 2019, in the league match against Al-Ain. On 25 September 2020, Haqawi joined Pro League side Damac. On 12 October 2020, Haqawi joined Al-Bukayriyah. On 3 September 2021, Haqawi joined Al-Ain.

References

External links
 

Living people
1995 births
Saudi Arabian footballers
Association football fullbacks
Al Nassr FC players
Al-Faisaly FC players
Najran SC players
Al-Nahda Club (Saudi Arabia) players
Al-Shoulla FC players
Damac FC players
Al-Bukayriyah FC players
Al-Ain FC (Saudi Arabia) players
Saudi First Division League players
Saudi Second Division players